Vladimirov or Vladimirova (feminine) is a Russian and Bulgarian surname, that is derived from the male given name Vladimir and literally means Vladimir's. 

People with the surname:
 Boris Vladimirov (1905–1978), Soviet army officer and Hero of the Soviet Union
 Emil Vladimirov
 Igor Vladimirov
  (1870–1947), Russian/Soviet painter and graphic artist
 Joseph Vladimirov, Russian painter of the 17th century
 Mikhail Vladimirov (1918–1992), Soviet aircraft pilot and Hero of the Soviet Union
 Miron Vladimirov (1879–1925), Soviet statesman and party figure
 Peter Vladimirov (1905–1953), author of The Vladimirov Diaries
 Vasily Vladimirov (born 1923), Soviet mathematician and academician
 Viktor Vladimirov (died 1995), Soviet general in Finland
 Vladimir Vladimirov (born 1986), Bulgarian footballer
 Vladimir Vladimirov (politician)
 Vladimir Vladimirov (1914–1943), Soviet army officer and Hero of the Soviet Union
 Yevgeniy Vladimirov (born 1957), Soviet and Kazakh chess player

See also
Vladimiroff
Vladimir (disambiguation)
Vladimirovsky

Russian-language surnames
Bulgarian-language surnames
Patronymic surnames
Surnames from given names